Metarctia didyma is a moth of the subfamily Arctiinae. It was described by Sergius G. Kiriakoff in 1957. It is found in the Central African Republic, Chad, Ghana, Ivory Coast, Niger and Nigeria.

References

 

Metarctia
Moths described in 1957